Obrowo may refer to the following places:
Obrowo, Toruń County in Kuyavian-Pomeranian Voivodeship (north-central Poland)
Obrowo, Tuchola County in Kuyavian-Pomeranian Voivodeship (north-central Poland)
Obrowo, Gmina Czarna Dąbrówka in Pomeranian Voivodeship (north Poland)
Obrowo, Gmina Miastko in Pomeranian Voivodeship (north Poland)
Obrowo, Greater Poland Voivodeship (west-central Poland)